The 2010 ASEAN University Games officially known as the 15th ASEAN University Games was a Southeast Asian university multi-sport event held in Chiang Mai, Thailand from 15 to 23 December 2010. Around 1064 athletes participated at the event, which featured 183 events in 15 sports.

Development and preparation
The Organising Committee of the 15th ASEAN University Games was formed to oversee the staging of the games.

Venues
The 15th ASEAN University Games had 13 venues for the games.

Marketing

Logo

The logo of the 2010 ASEAN University Games is a Galae, a traditional house constructed with Northern Lanna style intended to prevent bad
things or bad luck from entering the houses. In the logo, the Galae symbol represents the good things and happiness brought to the host nation of the games and visitors and participants from all ASEAN nations.

Mascot
The official mascot of the 2010 ASEAN University Games is a hill tribe youth named Nong Hug. The name Hug was chosen for the mascot, because Hug means Love in Northern Thai language which is also the beginning of unity and harmony. In English, the word Hug defines as to embrace or hold one's arms to show the love shared and to hug each other. Nong is the Thai word for young man, or little brother. The combination of love and hug as shown in the red cloth wrapped around Nong Hug's waist represents the existence of love when being hug for not just people of the host country Thailand but also participating countries of the games from Southeast Asia.

The games

Opening ceremony 
The Games opening ceremony was held at the Maejo University gymnasium on 15 December 2010, 16:14 (TST). The ceremony began with the athletes from participating nations paraded into the university's gymnasium led by flag bearers. After that, the Thai National Anthem was played as the national flag of Thailand was raised by students from the military school. This was followed by a hill tribe dance performance to honor the country's King and Queen for aiding and providing the hill tribespeople services such as crop replacement and outlet for handicrafts, and the speeches from Chiang Mai Deputy Governor Naruemol Palwat, Secretary General of the Office Higher Education Commission and President of the Organizing Committee Dr. Sumet and President of the ASEAN University Sports Council, Honorable Dato Professor Omar Osman. Chinaworn Bunyakiart, the Minister of Education for Thailand later gave his speech as well and went on to declare the games opened by the ceremonial gong three times, symbolizing good luck, health and prosperity. After that, Nonthiya Jiewbangpa, the singer of the 1995 Southeast Asian Games theme song, sang the games theme song, "We are one", and the athlete and referee oath were taken. Then three athletes, 2 footballers from Maejo and a karate exponent from Rajaphat University carried in the torch into the stadium and pass it on to Chiang Mai University student Thanyaluck Chotipiboon who carried the torch to light a giant Yi Peng lantern cauldron to start the games. The ceremony concluded with a Lanna cultural dance performance.

Closing ceremony 
The Ceremony was held at Maejo University Gymnasium on 23 December 2010 5 p.m. (TST). The ceremony began with the playing of Thai national anthem and the first dance performance by Maejo University students entitled “The Glory of the Land of Culture”, represented the beauty of Thailand's regions, nature, tradition and culture. After that, the local girls carry the signs of the 11 participating nations and the signs of 15 sports. Speeches were given by Chiang Mai Governor ML Panadda Diskul, Dr. Sumate Yamnoon, President of the Organizing Committee and Hon. Dato’ Prof. Omar Osman, Chairman of the ASEAN University Sports Council. Deputy Education Minister Chaiyos gave his speech as well and went on to declare the games closed. The games flag was lowered and was passed on to Laos, host of the 2012 ASEAN University Games when Sengdeuane Lachathabun, Deputy Minister of Education received the flag from Dr Sumate Yamnoon, and the games Council Chairman Osman. A Lao cultural dance segment performance was shown by Lao dancers, to symbolise Laos as the next host country. The flame of the 2010 ASEAN University Games was put out during the performance of “Together as One” by the students of Sansai Withayakhom School and Ranard Khun Inn Symphony. The ceremony concluded with dance and sing section by athletes from the 11 participating nations.

Participating nations

Sports

Calendar

 19 December 2010 was a rest day for the games.

Medal table 
Source:

References

External links 
 2010 ASEAN University Games official website
 Results system
 Chiang Mai Mail 2010 ASEAN University Games Newsletter

ASEAN University Games
ASEAN University Games
ASEAN University Games
ASEAN University Games
ASEAN University Games
ASEAN University Games